Monte Bolca is a lagerstätte near Verona, Italy that was one of the first fossil sites with high quality preservation known to Europeans, and is still an important source of fossils from the Eocene.

Geology
Monte Bolca was uplifted from the Tethys Ocean floor during the formation of the Alps, in two stages: one 24 million years ago, and one between 30 and 50 million years ago.

Within these layers, the fish and other specimens are so highly preserved that their organs are often completely intact in fossil form, and even the skin color can sometimes be determined. The normal rearrangement of the specimens caused by mud-dwelling organisms in the layer before it turned to stone has been avoided—it is assumed that the mud in question was low in oxygen, preventing both decay and the mixing action of scavengers.

History
Strictly speaking, the Monte Bolca site is one specific spot near the village of Bolca in Italy, known as the Pesciara ("The Fishbowl") due to its many extraordinarily well preserved Eocene fish fossils. However, there are several other related outcroppings in the general vicinity that also carry similar fossils, such as Monte Postale and Monte Vegroni. The term Monte Bolca is used interchangeably to refer to the one, original site, or to all the sites collectively.

The fossils at Monte Bolca have been known since at least the 16th century, and were studied intensively in the 19th century once it was definitively proven that fossils were the remnants of dead animals.

Fossils from Monte Bolca are commonly available for sale by commercial fossil dealers, and due to their popularity and preservation regularly sell for several hundred dollars.

Species in the formation

Animal fossils
Monte Bolca is rich in fish: 250 species (140 genera, 90 families and 19 orders).    Additionally a cephalopod, crustaceans, jellyfish and polychaete worms have been found whole, but foraminifera, molluscs, and corals are found in fragments and may have been transported.  Bird feathers and tortoise shell plates have been found, as well as many insects, freshwater and land plants.

Fossil animal species include 

Fish 
 Blochius longirostris an ancestral swordfish
 Ceratoichthys a jack fish
 Clupea catopygoptera, a herring
 Cyclopoma gigas, a bony-fish
 Eastmanalepes primaevus, a jack fish
 Eolactoria sorbinii, a boxfish
 Eoplatax papilio, a batfish 
 Exellia velifer, a spadefish 
 Godsilia lanceolata, a primitive tuna
 Lates gracilis, a relative of the Nile perch
 Lophius brachysomus, a primitive anglerfish
 Mene rhombea and Mene oblonga, moonfish
 Paranguilla tigrina, an eel
 Pasaichthys pleuronectiformis, a mooneyfish
 Platax altissimus and Platax macropterygius, batfish
 Proaracana dubia, an aracanid boxfish
 Protobalistum imperial, a relative of boxfish and triggerfish
 Psettopsis subarcuatus, a mooneyfish
 Pycnodus platessus, one of the last Pycnodontid ray-finned fishes
 Pygaeus nobilis, a bony-fish
 Serranus occipitalis, a sea bass
 Sharfia mirabilis, an anglerfish
 Sphyraena bolcensis, a barracuda
 Spinacanthus cuneiformis, a relative of boxfish and triggerfish
 Zorzinichthys
Lobster
Justitia desmaresti
Crocodile
Crocodilus vicetinus
Snakes
 Archaeophis bolcaensis
 Archaeophis proavus

Plant fossils

One of the more interesting puzzles in ichnotaxonomy, pertains to fossils from Monte Bolca, originally named Zoophycos caput-medusae, previously thought to be trace fossils, were found to be plants instead and given the name Algarum by French zoologist Henri Milne-Edwards in 1866.  The type specimen collected by Italian paleobotanist  Abramo Bartolommeo Massalongo before 1855 is at the Natural History Museum of Verona and was preserved in a lithographic limestone upper and lower slab.

When Italian botanist Achille Forti (28 November 1878 Verona -11 February 1937  Verona) worked on the specimens in 1926, they were reinterpreted as close relatives of the sea palm, now known to be a brown algae, which had lived in the coastal waters of the Eocene sea. He renamed the species Postelsia caput-medusae which makes it related to the genus Postelsia, now with only one living species, which was described by its discoverer Franz Josef Ruprecht in 1852 as Postelsia palmaeformis. His type-specimen is from Bodega Bay, California,  but the species is found along the Pacific coast. In life, the fronds hang vertically when the tide is in but flop over the stipe when exposed by low tide.

Curiously, other specimens from this deposit collected and described by Massalongo in 1855 were actually trace fossils, only this one was a plant.

See also
 List of fossil sites (with link directory)

References

External links
 PDF Les fossiles de Bolca - Fossils of Bolca - I fossili di Bolca
 PDF Fishes from the Eocene of Bolca,  Bannikov, Alexandre, Geodiversitas 28 (2): 249-275

Paleontological sites of Europe
Eocene Europe
Lagerstätten
Paleogene Italy
Paleontology in Italy
Archaeological sites in Veneto
Geography of Veneto
History of Veneto